Subbotino is a rural locality (a village) in Seletskoye Rural Settlement, Suzdalsky District, Vladimir Oblast, Russia. The population was 2 as of 2010.

Geography 
Subbotino is located on the Beryozka River, 24 km northeast of Suzdal (the district's administrative centre) by road. Bolshoye Borisovo is the nearest rural locality.

References 

Rural localities in Suzdalsky District